Edwin Thomas Boykin (December 27, 1854 – August 27, 1898) was a North Carolina politician who served in the North Carolina House of Representatives, the North Carolina Senate and as the sixth President pro tempore of the North Carolina Senate.

Early life
Boykin was born December 27, 1854, in Clinton, North Carolina.  His father died when he was a youth and his mother moved to the Durham, North Carolina, area.

Family life
Boykin married Katie G. Bizzell on December 28, 1876, they had several children.

Political career
Boykin was twice elected the mayor of Clinton, North Carolina. From 1881 to 1882 Boykin was one of two representatives elected to the North Carolina House of Representatives to represent the Fourteenth Senatorial District.  From 1883 to 1886 Boykin served in the North Carolina Senate again representing the fourteenth Senatorial District. On January 7, 1885, Boykin was chosen President pro tempore of the North Carolina Senate by his fellow senators.

Judicial career
In 1885 Boykin was appointed a judge for the Sixth Judicial Circuit of the North Carolina Superior Court to finish the term of Judge Allmand A. McKoy, who had died.  In 1886 Boykin was elected to the judgeship on his own right. Boykin resigned December 1896 to resume the practice of law.

Death
Boykin died suddenly on August 27, 1898, after "a stroke of apoplexy". He was buried in Raleigh the next day.

References
 

1854 births
1898 deaths
North Carolina state senators
Members of the North Carolina House of Representatives
People from Clinton, North Carolina
Duke University Trinity College of Arts and Sciences alumni
19th-century American politicians
Mayors of places in North Carolina